Panna Assembly constituency is one of the 230 Vidhan Sabha (Legislative Assembly) constituencies of Madhya Pradesh state in central India. This constituency came into existence in 1951 as one of the 48 Vidhan Sabha constituencies of the erstwhile Vindhya Pradesh state.

Overview
Panna (constituency number 60) is one of the 3 Vidhan Sabha constituencies located in Panna district. This constituency covers the entire Ajaigarh tehsil, Panna municipality and part of Panna tehsil of the district.

Panna is part of Khajuraho Lok Sabha constituency along with seven other Vidhan Sabha segments, namely, Gunnaor and Pawai in this district, Chandla and Rajnagar in Chhatarpur district and Vijayraghavgarh, Murwara and Bahoriband in Katni district.

Members of Legislative Assembly
As from a constituency of Vindhya Pradesh:
 1951: Saryu Prasad Chanpuriya, Indian National Congress 
As from a constituency of Madhya Pradesh:
 1957: Devendra Vijay Singh, Independent 
 1962: Narendra Singh, Indian National Congress
 1967: Het Ram Dubey, Indian National Congress
 1972: Het Ram Dubey, Indian National Congress
 1977: Lokendra Singh, Janata Party
 1980: Het Ram Dubey, Indian National Congress (I)
 1985: Jai Prakash Patel (Babu ji), Bharatiya Janata Party
 1990: Kusum Mehdele, Bharatiya Janata Party
 1993: Lokendra Singh, Indian National Congress
 1998: Kusum Mehdele, Bharatiya Janata Party
 2003: ,Kusum Mehdele Bharatiya Janata Party
 2008: Shrikant Dubey, Indian National Congress
 2013: Kusum Mehdele, Bharatiya Janata Party
 2018: Brijendra Pratap Singh, Bharatiya Janta Party

See also
 Panna

References

Panna district
Assembly constituencies of Madhya Pradesh